Air Ronge (2006 population 1,032) is a northern village in Northern Saskatchewan, Canada, 235 km north of Prince Albert. It lies on the western shore of Lac la Ronge, and is 3 km south of La Ronge and Lac La Ronge Provincial Park. According to 2006's census, the northern village is currently growing at 8.1%, and is one of the fastest-growing municipalities in Saskatchewan. There are an additional 3,500 people in La Ronge (though Saskatchewan Tourism claims more than 5,000 ) and 2,000 in the Lac La Ronge First Nation. The community is on the edge of the Canadian Shield. Highway 2 passes through the community.

Demographics 

See also

 List of communities in Northern Saskatchewan
 List of communities in Saskatchewan
 Villages of Saskatchewan

References 

Division No. 18, Saskatchewan
Northern villages in Saskatchewan